I Love Alaska is a 2009 documentary chronicling the AOL search history of "user 711391," whose searches are narrated by a monotone female voiceover. The film was produced by Submarine Channel, and released episodically in 2009 before being uploaded to stream for free on Minimovies.org.

Plot 
Only glimpsing the life of user 711391 through her search history, we are introduced to a middle-aged woman from Texas looking to rejuvenate her sex life and dreaming of life in Alaska.

Structure 
The film is broken into 13 episodes, each running between 3 and 6 minutes long. A voiceover reads aloud the searches of user 711391 in chronological order, indicated by a timestamp on the bottom of the screen. Each episode is accompanied by a steady shot of Alaska (e.g. a mountain range, a log cabin, a highway).

Background

References

External links
 

Films set in Alaska
Dutch short documentary films
2000s English-language films